Mitchell Construction was once a leading British civil engineering business based in Peterborough.

History
The business was founded by F.G. (Tiny) Mitchell in London in 1933 as an offshoot of Mitchell Engineering, his engineering business. In 1940 the Company moved to Peterborough because of the destruction created in London by The Blitz. David Morrell took over management of the business from Tiny Mitchell in 1954. During the 1950s the business expanded rapidly exploiting hydro-electric power opportunities in Scotland.

In 1962 Mitchell Construction acquired Kinnear Moodie, a leading tunneling business.

Major projects
Major projects undertaken by the business included:
 The Loch Cluanie Dam completed in 1957
 Chapelcross Power Station completed in 1959
 The advanced gas-cooled reactor at Sellafield completed in 1962
 Fawley Power Station at Southampton completed in 1962
 The Scotswood Bridge completed in 1967
 The Kariba Dam North Cavern completed in 1973

Demise of the business
After getting into financial difficulties over the Kariba Dam North Cavern project, the company was acquired by Tarmac and integrated into Tarmac Construction in 1973.

References

Sources

Construction and civil engineering companies established in 1933
Construction and civil engineering companies of the United Kingdom
Companies based in Cambridgeshire
Companies disestablished in 1973
1933 establishments in England
1973 disestablishments in England
Construction and civil engineering companies disestablished in the 20th century
British companies established in 1933
British companies disestablished in 1973